Menifee Union School District is a school district located in the city of Menifee, California, serving grades K-8. The district plans on adding at least two more schools in addition to the ones listed below.

Elementary 
Callie Kirkpatrick Elementary
Chester W. Morrison Elementary
Evans Ranch Elementary
Freedom Crest Elementary
Oak Meadows Elementary
Quail Valley Elementary
Ridgemoor Elementary
Southshore Elementary
Bouris Elementary
Taawila Elementary

Middle 
Bell Mountain Middle
Hans Christensen Middle
Menifee Valley Middle School

References

External links
Official site
Menifee Union School District News - Menifee 24/7

School districts in Riverside County, California
Menifee, California